Tanzania competed at the 1990 Commonwealth Games in Auckland, New Zealand by a nine-member strong contingent, collecting a total number of three medals (one silver, two bronze).

Medals

Silver
 Haji Ally — Athletics, Men's Featherweight (– 57 kg)

Bronze
 Simon Robert Naali — Athletics, Men's Marathon

 Bakari Mambeya — Athletics, Men's Lightweight (– 60 kg)

Competitors by event
Men's Marathon
Simon Robert Naali	
Alfredo Shahanga 	
Juma Ikangaa 	
 
Women's Javelin
Matilda Kasava

Boxing
Men's Light Flyweight (– 48 kg)
Anthony Mwang'onda
Lost to Domenic Figliomeni (CAN), 1-4

Men's Flyweight (– 51 kg)
Benjamin Mwangata
Defeated Teboho Mafatle (LES), RSC-3
Lost to Wayne McCullough (IRL), 0-5

Men's Featherweight (– 57 kg)
Haji Ally
Defeated John Williams (WAL), 5-0
Defeated David Gakuha (KEN), 4-1
Lost to John Irwin (ENG), 0-5

Men's Lightweight (– 60 kg)
Bakari Mambeya
Defeated John Mkangala (MLW), 5-0
Lost to Justin Rowsell (AUS), 1-4

Men's Welterweight (– 67 kg)
Joseph Marwa
Lost to Grahame Cheney (AUS), 1-4

See also
Tanzania at the 1988 Summer Olympics
Tanzania at the 1992 Summer Olympics

References
Commonwealth Games Federation

Tanzania at the Commonwealth Games
Nations at the 1990 Commonwealth Games
Commonwealth Games